Tutti Frutti is a Croatian and former Yugoslav rock band formed in the mid-1980s. The band is best known for its hit songs "Nasloni glavu na moje rame", "Ne bojim se drugova tvoga frajera", "Stvari lagane"" and "Dalmacijo", the latter being the anthem of the Croatian football club Hajduk Split and its supporters, celebrating the Dalmatia region. In 2010, the band recorded a new album named Pivo i tekila (Beer and tequila) and dissolved again.

Band members

Ivo Amulić - singer (formation - 1986-1991, 2009-2010)
Marsell Benzon - singer (1991-1994)
Alen Nižetić - singer (1994–1996)
Ivo Jagnjić - Lead guitar 
Zdravko Sunara - Drums
Nenad Ninčević - Rhythm guitar 
Davor Pastuović - Bass
Miroslav Miše - Rovinjež - Keyboards, piano

Albums

1986 - Brzi vlak u nogama
1987 - Gore iznad oblaka
1988 - Stvari lagane
1989 - Krila leptira
1990 - Opusti se i uživaj
1992 - Vozio sam cijelu noć
1996 - Ruže i vino
1997 - Stvari lagane (compilation)
2007 - Zlatna kolekcija (compilation)
2010 - Pivo i tekila

References

 

Croatian rock music groups
Yugoslav rock music groups